KOHS (91.7 FM) is a non-profit non-commercial educational high school radio station broadcasting an alternative music format.  The radio station is licensed by the Federal Communications Commission (FCC) to serve the community of Orem, Utah.  The radio station is owned by the Alpine School District and operated by the students of Orem High School.

References

External links
Official website

OHS
High school radio stations in the United States
Radio stations established in 1974
Utah County, Utah